Ketel Ricardo Marte Valdez (born October 12, 1993) is a Dominican professional baseball second baseman for the Arizona Diamondbacks of Major League Baseball (MLB). He previously played for the Seattle Mariners. Marte made his MLB debut with the Mariners in 2015, and was traded to the Diamondbacks during the 2016–17 offseason. Marte was an All Star in 2019.

Career

Seattle Mariners
Marte signed with the Seattle Mariners as an international free agent on August 13, 2010. He made his professional debut in 2011 for the Dominican Summer League Mariners. He played 2012 with the Everett AquaSox of the Class A-Short Season Northwest League and Clinton LumberKings of the Class A Midwest League. Marte spent 2013 with Clinton and the High Desert Mavericks of the Class A-Advanced California League. He batted .295 with a .687 on-base plus slugging (OPS). Marte started 2014 with the Jackson Generals of the Class AA Southern League and was promoted to the Tacoma Rainiers of the Class AAA Pacific Coast League (PCL). He finished the season hitting .304 with a .746 OPS and four home runs. On November 20, 2014 Ketel was placed on the 40–man roster.

The Mariners promoted Marte to the major leagues on July 31, 2015. His performance led the Mariners to be comfortable with trading fellow shortstop Brad Miller. However, Marte struggled in 2016, batting .259 with a .287 on-base percentage and striking out 84 times in 119 games. He also went on the disabled list three times. The Mariners attempted to trade for the Cincinnati Reds' Zack Cozart during the season.

Arizona Diamondbacks

On November 23, 2016, the Mariners traded Marte and Taijuan Walker to the Arizona Diamondbacks for Jean Segura, Mitch Haniger, and Zac Curtis. Marte began the 2017 season with the Reno Aces of the PCL. The Diamondbacks promoted him to the major leagues on June 28. In his first playoff game in October 4 that same year, he hit two triples in an 11–8 Wild Card win over the Colorado Rockies, becoming only the 8th player to record two triples in the same playoff game and the first to do so in an ambidextrous manner. Marte was moved from shortstop to 2nd base by the Diamondbacks at the beginning of the 2018 season to make room for shortstop Nick Ahmed in the Arizona starting infield.  In 2018, Marte led all of MLB in triples with 12.

Batting .316 with 20 home runs and 51 RBIs, Marte was named the starting second baseman for the 2019 Major League Baseball All-Star Game. The following season, Marte hit .287 with 2 home runs and 17 RBI.

On April 8, 2021, Marte was placed on the 10-day injured list with a right hamstring strain. He returned on May 19.

On March 29, 2022, Marte signed a five-year, $76 million contract extension with the Diamondbacks.

Personal life

Marte is the nephew of Wilson Valdez, and is married to the cousin of Vladimir Guerrero Jr.

References

External links

1993 births
Living people
Arizona Diamondbacks players
Arizona League Mariners players
Clinton LumberKings players
Dominican Republic expatriate baseball players in the United States
Dominican Summer League Mariners players
Everett AquaSox players
Gigantes del Cibao players
High Desert Mavericks players
Jackson Generals (Southern League) players
Major League Baseball players from the Dominican Republic
Major League Baseball infielders
National League All-Stars
People from Nizao
Reno Aces players
Seattle Mariners players
Tacoma Rainiers players